Kingston is a civil parish in Kings County, New Brunswick, Canada.

For governance purposes it forms the local service district of the parish of Kingston, which is a member of the Fundy Regional Service Commission (FRSC).

Origin of name
The parish's name may have been chosen as a symbol of loyalty to the Crown but was also a common name in the Thirteen Colonies.

Notable is that the names of Kings County's pre-1800 parishes all occur in both New Jersey and North Carolina.

History
Kingston was erected in 1786 as one of the original parishes of Kings County. It included Greenwich Parish and parts of Hampton, Kars, and Norton Parishes but part of the modern parish along the Kennebecasis River was in Westfield Parish.

In 1795 Kings County's parishes were reorganised, erecting Hampton and Norton.

In 1844 the boundary with Norton was altered.

Boundaries
Kingston Parish is bounded:

on the northwest by the Long Reach of the Saint John River and Belleisle Bay;
on the east by a line beginning on the shore of Belleisle Bay at the end of the western line of the William Roden grant, nearly due north of the junction of Route 845 and Kiersteadville Road, then running south-southwesterly along the grant line to the rear of the grant, then southwesterly  about 300 metres along the northern line of the Jeremiah Maybe grant to its northwestern corner, then southeasterly along its western line for about 1.2 kilometres, then turning left 90º and running northeasterly parallel to the rear line of the Belleisle Bay shore grants until it strikes Rogers Road, then southeasterly along the prolongation of the eastern line of the John & Peter Cable grant on the Kennebecasis River until it strikes the rear of the Cable grant, about 1.3 kilometres northeast of Route 845 and near the northern bank of Pickwauket Brook, then west-southwesterly along the rear of the Kennebecasis River grants, including a dogleg toward the river, until it reaches the northwestern corner of the Freedom Burdock grant, about 150 metres past the Ketchum Road, then southeasterly along the western line of the Burdock grant to the Kennebecasis River;
on the southeast by the Kennebecasis River;
on the southwest by the southwestern line of the Stephen Baxter grant on Milkish Creek, prolonged southeasterly to the Saint John County line in the Kennebecasis, then northwesterly about 2.7 kilometres along the Baxter grant until it strikes the prolongation of the main tier of grants on the Kennebecasis, then northeasterly along the rear of the tier until it strikes the prolongation of the line between two grants to Robert and Caleb Merrit on the Long Reach, then northwesterly along the prolongation and the grant line to the Long Reach;
including Long Island and Mather Island in the Kennebecasis.

Governance
The entire parish forms the local service district of the parish of Kingston, established in 1968 to assess for fire protection. Non-fire related rescue was added in 2015. First aid and ambulance services (1976–2015) was formerly included.

Communities
Communities at least partly within the parish.

Bedford
Centreton
Chapel Grove
Clifton Royal
Elmhurst
Erbs Cove
Grays Mills
Holderville
Kingston
Kingston Corner
Long Reach
Lower Kingston
Moss Glen
Perry Point
Reeds Point
Shampers
The Cedars
Waltons Lake
Whitehead
Whites Bluff
Whites Mills

Bodies of water
Bodies of water at least partly in the parish.

Kennebecasis River
North Channel
Saint John River
Gorhams Creek
Kingston Creek
Salmon Creek
Belleisle Bay
at least twenty officially named lakes

Islands
Islands at least partly in the parish.
Long Island
Mather Island

Demographics

Population
Population trend

Language
Mother tongue (2016)

Access Routes
Highways and numbered routes that run through the parish, including external routes that start or finish at the parish limits:

Highways
None

Principal Routes
None

Secondary Routes:

External Routes:
None

See also
List of parishes in New Brunswick

Notes

References

Parishes of Kings County, New Brunswick
Local service districts of Kings County, New Brunswick